Sorong is the largest city and the capital of the Indonesian province of Southwest Papua. The city is located on the western tip of the island of New Guinea with its only land borders being with Sorong Regency. It is the gateway to Indonesia's Raja Ampat Islands, species rich coral reef islands in an area considered the heart of the world's coral reef biodiversity.  It also is the logistics hub for Indonesia's thriving eastern oil and gas frontier. Sorong has experienced exponential growth since 2010, and further growth is anticipated as Sorong becomes linked by road to other frontier towns in Papua's Bird's Head Peninsula. The city had a population of 190,625 at the 2010 Census and 284,410 at the 2020 Census; the latest official estimate (as at mid 2021) is 289,767.  It is served by Domine Eduard Osok Airport.

Etymology
The origin of Sorong's name comes from the word Soren, which means "deep and wavy ocean" in the Biak language. The name was first used by the Biak-Numfor people who sailed to different islands before they finally decided to settle down in Raja Ampat Islands. When the Biak-Numfor people came to the place called "Daratan Maladum", they decided to call it Soren. After centuries of contact with Chinese merchants, European missionaries, and people from Maluku and Sangihe-Talaud, the name underwent further change into Sorong.

Administrative districts
At the 2010 Census, the city comprised six districts (distrik), but the number has subsequently been increased to ten by the splitting of existing districts. These are tabulated below with their populations at the 2010 Census and 2020 Census, together with the official estimates for mid-2021. The table also includes the locations of the district administrative centres, the number of administrative villages (rural desa and urban kelurahan, 41 in total) in each district, and its post code.

Note: (a) A coastal strip along the northern edge of the city. (b) the populations as at 2010 of the four new districts established after 2010 are included in the figures for the districts from which they were split off. (c) Sorong Kepulauan District comprises 25 islands off the west coast of Sorong but within the city limits, including Doom, Soop, Raam and Umbre Islands.

Climate
Sorong experiences a tropical rainforest climate (Köppen Af), as there is no real dry season throughout the year. The excessive rainfall is caused by the monsoon. The temperature variation remains constant throughout the year.

Container port
A container port is to be built in Sorong with an annual container-handling capacity of 500,000 twenty-foot equivalent units (TEUs) and cost Rp.800 billion (US$93.6 million). Construction began in early 2012 and was expected to be complete in mid-2013, but was delayed.

In popular culture 
The phrase "Sorong to Samarai" sometimes be voiced from Papuan independence activists in reference to Papuan unification, with Sorong being on the westernmost extremity of the Papuan island, and Samarai being one of the easternmost point located in Milne Bay Province, Papua New Guinea. In 2016, the ARIA Music Awards-nominated Papua New Guinean-Australian musician Airileke released a single title "Sorong Samarai".

Cooperation and friendship
In addition to its sister cities, Sorong cooperates with:
 Baltimore, United States
 Busan, South Korea
 Fukuoka, Japan

References

External links

  

 
Cities in Indonesia
Populated coastal places in Indonesia
Populated places in Southwest Papua
Port cities and towns in Indonesia
Provincial capitals in Indonesia
Western New Guinea